Yueju may refer to the following regional Chinese opera genres:

Yue opera, from Zhejiang and Shanghai
Cantonese opera, from Guangdong

See also 
Henan opera, also called Yuju, a Chinese opera genre from Henan
Yuediao (越调), a Chinese opera genre also from Henan
Yue (disambiguation)